Gope, GOPE,  or GOPe may refer to:
 Gop, Odisha, a town in India
 Grand Old Party establishment, American Republican Party establishment
Grupo de Operaciones Policiales Especiales, a police special operations unit in Chile
Gope (actor) (1917–1957), Indian Hindi actor
Gope (Papua), a type of spiritual sculpture
 Gope College, Midnapore, West Bengal, India

See also 
Gope board